The knock-out stage of the 2014 CAF Confederation Cup was played from 20 September to 6 December 2014. A total of four teams competed in the knock-out stage.

Qualified teams
The winners and runners-up of each of the two groups in the group stage qualified for the knock-out stage.

Format
Knock-out ties were played on a home-and-away two-legged basis. If the sides were level on aggregate after the second leg, the away goals rule was applied, and if still level, the tie proceeded directly to a penalty shoot-out (no extra time was played).

Schedule
The schedule of each round was as follows.

Semi-finals
In the semi-finals, the group A winners played the group B runners-up, and the group B winners played the group A runners-up, with the group winners hosting the second leg.

|}

Séwé Sport won 1–0 on aggregate and advanced to the final.

Al-Ahly won 3–1 on aggregate and advanced to the final.

Final

In the final, the order of legs was decided by a draw, held after the group stage draw (29 April 2014, 11:00 UTC+2, at the CAF Headquarters in Cairo, Egypt).

|}

2–2 on aggregate. Al-Ahly won on the away goals rule.

References

External links
Orange CAF Confederation Cup 2014, CAFonline.com

3